Let's Pretend was a 1980s children's television series aimed at preschool aged children in the United Kingdom. It was shown across the ITV network at 12:10 on Tuesdays, then later on Mondays, replacing the popular Pipkins which had been cancelled at the end of 1981. Like its predecessor, each edition was fifteen minutes long, and the programme was produced using many of the same personnel, such as the puppeteer Nigel Plaskitt and the producer Michael Jeans.

Each week the presenters would find a number of ordinary household items and contrive to produce a short story featuring them all. The first programme, "The Story Of The Broken Puppet", was shown on Tuesday 5 January 1982 by Central Television. The show was broadcast weekly until 1988. Big Centre TV has since re-aired the programme. The show's original opening titles showed items moving along a conveyor belt into the mouth of a large plastic whale, and later a puppet caterpillar moving along the screen. The actual story began with the rising of a curtain with the same puppet caterpillar on accompanied to the same bars of the song On Ilkla Moor Baht 'at that were used as the pre-programme ident of Yorkshire Television.

Transmission guide

Series 1 (1982)
The Story of the Broken Puppet – 5 January 1982
The Story of the Leaping Frog – 12 January 1982
The Story of the Dancing Elephant – 19 January 1982
The Hungry Pillar Box – 26 January 1982
The Garden Bench – 2 February 1982
The Shoe That Wanted to Go Its Own Way – 9 February 1982
The Whistling Kettle – 16 February 1982
The Teapot That Lost Its Lid – 23 February 1982
The Zoo Keeper and the Giraffe – 2 March 1982
The Story of the Cleaner and the Cook – 9 March 1982
The Story of the Rabbit and the Mole – 16 March 1982
The Tale of Two Bears – 23 March 1982
The Story of How the Bus Got up the Hill – 30 March 1982
The Story of the Sleepless Owl  – 6 April 1982
The Story of the King Who Loved Bananas  – 13 April 1982
The Umbrella That Didn't Like Rain – 20 April 1982
The Cheesemaker and the Mouse – 27 April 1982
The Story of the Giant's Boots – 4 May 1982

Series 2 (1982-1983)
The King Who Liked Music – 24 August 1982
The Snowman – 31 August 1982
The Jack Who Wouldn't Come Out of His Box – 7 September 1982
The Cat That Liked Mice – 14 September 1982
The Sailors Who Lost Their Sail – 21 September 1982
The Piggy Bank – 28 September 1982
The Goldfish Who Swam Away from His Bowl – 5 October 1982
The Clock That Forgot to Tock – 12 October 1982
The Hole – 19 October 1982
The Soldier and the Crown – 26 October 1982
 – 2 November 1982
The Greedy Crocodile – 9 November 1982
The Boat That Had No Paddle – 16 November 1982
The Witch and the Sweeper – 23 November 1982
The Old Man and the Duck – 30 November 1982
The Fork Lift Truck – 7 December 1982
The Man Who Wanted His Milk – 14 December 1982
The Cow That Wanted to Jump Over the Moon  – 21 December 1982
Worn Out Teddy – 28 December 1982
The Smallest Circus in the World – 10 January 1983
The Little Cloud That Cried – 17 January 1983
The Stripy Deckchair – 24 January 1983
Baby Hedgehog's Discovery – 31 January 1983
The Two Parrots – 7 February 1983
The Balloon That Lost Its Puff – 14 February 1983
Colin the Court Jester – 21 February 1983
The Caterpillar and the Butterfly – 28 February 1983
The Sad Banana – 7 March 1983
Henrietta's Tea Party – 14 March 1983
The Band Got Smaller and Smaller – 21 March 1983
The Rag Doll and the King – 28 March 1983
The Scarecrow That Wanted to Look Smart – 11 April 1983
The Hopping Kangaroo – 18 April 1983
Tom Thumb and the Race – 25 April 1983
The Dancing Dragon – 9 May 1983

1980s British children's television series
1982 British television series debuts
1988 British television series endings
British preschool education television series
British television shows featuring puppetry
English-language television shows
Television shows produced by Central Independent Television
ITV children's television shows
Television series by ITV Studios